Rococo were a London-based English progressive rock band, initially operating in the 1970s. They had three singles release in that decade. The band reformed in the 21st Century and have had five albums released, three on Angel Air Records.

Career
Always leaning towards the alternative, underground rock scene, they also promoted their own gigs, appeared at the Windsor Free Festival and the anti-Establishment hippy community centre, The Warehouse in Twickenham, but also worked through the Chrysalis agency, which led them to support Ten Years After at London's Rainbow Theatre. Other bands they worked alongside in the 1970s included Thin Lizzy, Ian Dury and the Blockheads, Shakin' Stevens and the Sunsets, Climax Chicago Blues Band, Curved Air and Genesis

Rococo built up a devoted following and featured Ian Raines (lead vocals), Roy Shipston (keyboards/vocals), Rod Halling (guitar/vocals), Clive Edwards (drums) and John "Rhino" Edwards on bass guitar. Disguised as The Brats, they inadvertently became involved in the vanguard of the punk rock movement.

They appeared in the finals of a Melody Maker contest in 1974, using their pseudonym, and advertised in Melody Maker the prizewinners' final at The Round House as "The Brats plus 12 support acts". Consequently, the organisers deemed not to declare them winners, although they took most of the major prizes.

They released three singles: "Ultrastar" (b/w "Wildfire") on Deram Records in 1973; "Follow That Car" (b/w "Lucinda (Flint n'Tinder Love)") through Mountain Records in 1976; and "Home Town Girls" (b/w "Quicksilver Mail") under another pseudonym, Future, on a small independent record label in 1981.

Rococo reformed in the 21st Century with the original line-up, apart from John "Rhino" Edwards, and have had three CD albums released on Angel Air Records: Run from the Wildfire (SJPCD337); The Firestorm and Other Love Songs (SJPCD370) and, in October 2014, Losing Ground (SJPCD437).

Band members

Recent
Ian Raines - Lead vocals, bass guitar
Roy Shipston - keyboards, lead vocals, backing vocals
Clive Edwards - drums, percussion
Rod Halling - guitar, backing vocals
Tym Scopes - guitar
James Fox - bass guitar, backing vocals

Past
John Edwards - bass guitar
Steve Carman - bass guitar
Gary Harvey - bass guitar
Richard Stevens - lead vocals

Guest Performers
Chris Thompson - lead vocals
Charlie Morgan - drums
David Paton - bass guitar
Ronnie Johnson - guitar
Alan Townsend - backing vocals
Alice Spring - backing vocals 
Alice Raines - backing vocals
Emily Raines - backing vocals

Discography

Albums
The Living Rock (Flopidiscs 2003)
Hoodlum Fun (Flopidiscs 2003)
Run From The Wildfire (Angel Air Records 2010)
The Firestorm and Other Love Songs (Angel Air Records 2011)
Losing Ground (Angel Air Records 2014)
 Angel Air releases produced by Ray Hendriksen and Roy Shipston

Singles
"Ultrastar" / "Wildfire" (Deram 1973)
"Follow That Car" / "Lucinda (Flint n'Tinder Love)" (Mountain Records 1976)
"Home Town Girls" / "Quicksilver Mail" (Paro 1981, under the name "Future")

External links
 Angel Air Records - Losing Ground CD

Musical groups from London
English rock music groups
Musical groups established in 1970